Northampton County is a county located in the Commonwealth of Virginia. As of the 2020 census, the population was 12,282. Its county seat is Eastville. Northampton and Accomack Counties are a part of the larger Eastern Shore of Virginia.

The county is the center of the late Eocene meteor strike that resulted in the Chesapeake Bay impact crater. The Northampton County Courthouse Historic District is part of the Eastville Historic District at the county seat.

History
When English colonists first arrived in the area in the early 1600s, the Virginia Eastern Shore region was governed by Debedeavon (aka "The Laughing King"), who was the paramount chief of the Accomac people, which numbered around 2,000 at the time. The former name of the county was Accomac Shire, one of the original eight shires of Virginia after the founding of the first settlement at Jamestown in 1607. In 1642, the name was changed to Northampton County by the colonists. In 1663, Northampton County was split into two counties that still exist today. The northern two-thirds took the original "Accomac" name (Accomack County), while the southern third to the Point Cape Charles remained as Northampton.

Slavery

Northampton County is notable for a colonial court case involving an indentured servant. The first free negro (a term used prior to the abolition of slavery) in North America was Anthony Johnson of Northampton County. Johnson was one of the first African-Americans to own land in America. In 1653, Johnson brought suit in Northampton County Court to argue that one of his servants, John Casor, was indentured to him for life. Casor had left him and was working for a neighbor. The court ruled in Johnson's favor, making Northampton County the first jurisdiction to legally acknowledge that Black people could own slaves. 

This court ruling decision also gives insight to how owners of indentured servants could easily choose to ignore the expiration of indentured contracts and force their servants into lifetime slavery. Although Casor, an African, had well-known white planters taking his part, he was reduced to lifetime slavery. Some planters sought more profitable methods of labor by taking advantage of Negro indentured servants, who had little recourse in the legal and social system to protect their rights.

Geography

Adjacent county and independent city
 Accomack County – north
 Virginia Beach, Virginia – south

National protected areas
 Eastern Shore of Virginia National Wildlife Refuge
 Fisherman Island National Wildlife Refuge

Demographics

2020 census

Note: the US Census treats Hispanic/Latino as an ethnic category. This table excludes Latinos from the racial categories and assigns them to a separate category. Hispanics/Latinos can be of any race.

2020 Census

As of the census of 2010, there were 12,389 people, 5,321 households, and 3,543 families residing in the county. The population density was 63 people per square mile (24/km2). There were 6,547 housing units at an average density of 32 per square mile (12/km2). The racial makeup of the county was 57.9% White, 36.5% Black or African American, 0.2% Native American, 0.7% Asian, 0.1% Pacific Islander, 3.2% from other races, and 1.4% from two or more races. 7.1% of the population were Hispanic or Latino of any race.

The largest ancestry groups in Northampton County include: African American (36%), English American (15%), German (7%), Irish (6%) and Italian (3%)

There were 5,321 households, out of which 25.70% had children under the age of 18 living with them, 45.30% were married couples living together, 17.50% had a female householder with no husband present, and 33.40% were non-families. 29.40% of all households were made up of individuals, and 15.60% had someone living alone who was 65 years of age or older. The average household size was 2.39 and the average family size was 2.94.

In the county, the age distribution of the population shows 23.30% under the age of 18, 7.10% from 18 to 24, 23.60% from 25 to 44, 24.80% from 45 to 64, and 21.20% who were 65 years of age or older. The median age was 42 years. For every 100 females there were 87.90 males. For every 100 females age 18 and over, there were 84.10 males.

The median income for a household in the county was $28,276, and the median income for a family was $385,034. Males had a median income of $26,842 versus $21,839 for females. The per capita income for the county was $16,591. About 15.80% of families and 20.50% of the population were below the poverty line, including 29.20% of those under age 18 and 16.50% of those age 65 or over.

Northampton County is home to the United States' oldest continuous court records.

Transportation
 Campbell Field Airport

Major highways

Education
Northampton County Public Schools operates public schools in the county.

Communities

Towns
 Belle Haven (Partly in Accomack County)
 Cape Charles
 Cheriton
 Eastville
 Exmore
 Nassawadox

Census-designated places

 Franktown
 Willis Wharf

Other unincorporated communities

 Arlington
 Bacon Hill
 Bay Ridge
 Bayford
 Bayview
 Beverly
 Birdsnest
 Bridgetown
 Broadwater
 Capeville
 Cedar Grove
 Cheapside
 Cherrystone
 Chesapeake
 Clearview
 Culls
 Dalbys
 Eastville Station
 Fairview
 Hadlock
 Hare Valley
 Highland Heights
 Hungars Point
 James Crossroads
 Jamesville
 Johnson Cove
 Johnsontown
 Kendall Grove
 Kiptopeke
 Little Johnsontown
 Little Salisbury
 Machipongo
 Magotha
 Marionville
 Middletown
 Nottingham
 Oakland Park
 Oyster
 Pat Town
 Red Bank
 Reedtown
 Seaview
 Shadyside
 Sheps End
 Silver Beach
 Simpkins
 Smith Beach
 Stumptown
 The Meadows
 Townsend
 Treherneville
 Wardtown
 Weirwood
 Woodstock

Politics
Northampton County leans towards the Democratic Party. In presidential elections, it has voted for the Democratic nominee every time since 1992.

Notable people
 John Casor, the first person of African descent in England's Thirteen Colonies to be declared as a slave for life as the result of a civil suit
 Adrian "Ace" Custis (1974-), former NCAA All-America basketball player at Virginia Tech, which retired his jersey. He is a 1992 graduate of Northampton High School.
 Alvy Powell (1955-), opera singer, performed National Anthem at inauguration of President George H.W. Bush. He is a 1974 graduate of Northampton High School.
 Ralph Northam (1959-), 40th Lieutenant Governor of Virginia (2014-2018) and 73rd Governor of Virginia (2018-2022).
 Abel Upshur (1791–1844), born in Northampton County, United States Secretary of State and United States Secretary of the Navy
 Tyler Webb (1990-), MLB relief pitcher, currently playing for the St. Louis Cardinals.

See also
 National Register of Historic Places listings in Northampton County, Virginia

References

External links

 

 
1634 establishments in Virginia
Populated places established in 1634
Virginia counties
Virginia counties on the Chesapeake Bay